WXUS (102.3 FM) is a commercial radio station licensed to Dunnellon, Florida, and broadcasting to the Ocala media market. It is owned by JVC Broadcasting and airs a radio format combining country music and Southern-influenced classic rock.  WXUS's transmitter is off West Highway 328 in Dunnellon.

History

WTRS-FM
WXUS first signed on the air on March 3, 1969 as WTRS-FM, with 3,000 watts of power. WTRS-FM (Welcome to Rainbow Springs) was Dunnellon's first radio station and one of the earliest successful FM Top 40 stations. The station was sold in 1975 after one of its owners died in an automobile accident, and the format was changed to "Contemporary Easy Listening," a hybrid of beautiful music and adult contemporary. WTRS-FM was converted to a country format in 1978, and became one of West-Central Florida's most popular stations. The station was sold again in 1981 and switched to Drake-Chenault's beautiful music format, only to switch back to country music after only six months following a deluge of listener complaints. WTRS had been a country station continuously until 2016. In 1983 the station was sold to its then-owner, Asterisk Communications, who upgraded the WTRS signal from 3,000 to 50,000 watts and in 1988 moved the station to new studios in Ocala.

WTRS is unusual among country stations in that it takes an implicitly male-oriented approach, particularly during the drive times. The Bubba the Love Sponge Show, a show typically aired on active rock stations, airs on the morning drive lineup.  The station's afternoon drive show, "Dave and Bo", also aims for a male audience.

On June 29, 2016 at 10 a.m., WTRS relaunched with a country-southern rock hybrid format, branded as "U.S. 102.3". The station changed its call sign to WXUS on July 5, 2016.

On July 31, 2017, Bubba The Love Sponge show was dropped from their daily lineup.

WTRS AM (1970-1992)
In 1970, WTRS added an AM station, broadcasting on 920 kHz with 500 watts of power. Beginning as a beautiful-music station, AM 920 alternated between country and easy-listening formats through the 1970s.  The calls were briefly WGAM from 1980 to 1982, programming first country music (Drake-Chenault's "Great American Country" format) and then adult standards. In 1982 the station once again became WTRS and settled into a simulcast of 102.3 FM, which it remained until 1992 when the station surrendered its license to the FCC and its frequency was deleted.

WXUS-HD2
On June 22, 2019, WXUS launched an oldies format on its HD2 subchannel, branded as "True Oldies Y100".

References

External links
WTRS-FM history
WTRS-AM history

External links
WXUS Official Website

XUS
Country radio stations in the United States
Radio stations established in 1969
1969 establishments in Florida